Retrofit is an album by Blackpool post-punk/electro band Section 25 and released by LTM Recordings on 14 September 2010.

Overview
The album contains nine re-recordings of tracks spanning their entire history, as well as a new song entitled "Über Hymn" and a remix of "Looking From A Hilltop" by Stephen Morris. The project was initially started prior to founder and bassist Larry Cassidy's death in 2010 and contains vocal excerpts from his last studio sessions at West Orange Studios (from July 2009 onwards), as well as daughter Bethany Cassidy on new vocals.

Track listing
 "The Process" (5.31)
 "Looking From A Hilltop" (6.05)
 "Beating Heart" (4.24)
 "Desert" (5.16)
 "Über Hymn" (3.55)
 "Garageland" (4.55)
 "Dirty Disco" (5.34)
 "Girls Don't Count" (5.27)
 "New Horizon" (6.02)
 "Wretch" (4.15)
 "Another Hilltop" (remixed by Stephen Morris) (9.18)

Personnel
Larry Cassidy – vocals
Bethany Cassidy – vocals
Vincent Cassidy – drums, percussion, vocals
Stuart Hill – bass, programming, backing vocals
Steven Stringer – guitar, programming, sequencing

References

2010 albums